Ian Monroe (born 1972) is an artist based in London.

Monroe was born in Cooperstown, New York and spent his childhood in Reston, Virginia, a planned community 25 miles outside of Washington, D.C. Monroe received his BFA (Bachelor of Fine Arts) from Washington University in St. Louis in 1995. He went on to complete an MA (again in visual art) from Goldsmiths College, London, in 2002. The main work he exhibited at his MA show, Canyon Recreated, was bought by Charles Saatchi.  Monroe came to public attention in 2003 when this piece was featured in the opening exhibition at the new Saatchi Gallery. Since then, Monroe's work has been acquired by a number of international museums and private collections.

Monroe makes large-scale images of illusionistic spaces via the medium of collage as well as sculpture using text to form structures. Monroe's work is primarily concerned with investigating both the visual and conceptual possibilities of the technological landscape.

References

External links
Ian Monroe's website
Images, texts and biography at the Saatchi Gallery

1972 births
Living people
Artists from London
Artists from Virginia
Alumni of Goldsmiths, University of London
Sam Fox School of Design & Visual Arts alumni
Washington University in St. Louis alumni